Inverkeithny is a village in the Formartine area of Aberdeenshire, Scotland. In 1990, it was described by Charles McKean as "near-deserted".

Netherdale House, an Italianate mansion on a bluff high above the river, was built in 1774, while Muiresk House dates to before 1604. Carnousie, a Z-plan chateau of the Ogilvies of Carnousie, was built in 1577.

Population

Inverkeithny parish church
The parish church was built, probably by Alexander and William Reid, in 1881, costing nearly £2,000. The church is now owned and operated by Inverkeithny Kirk Preservation Trust, a registered Scottish charity.

Notes and references

Further reading

External links

Villages in Aberdeenshire